Paseo Pizarro is pedestrian walk located on the main street of Trujillo city, in Peru. Pizarro street in blocks 5,6,7 and 8 becomes exclusively a pedestrian and joins the Plaza de Armas with the Plazuela El Recreo, along its four blocks are numerous landmarks like the Palace Iturregui, the Emancipation House, etc. and businesses such as supermarkets, souvenir shops, cafes and bars, etc.

Description

It is located in the Historic Centre of Trujillo 5th block of Pizarro street. In this street of Trujillo's historic centre are also major banks and private and state institutions in the region as the office of the Ombudsman in block 3 and the Reserve Central Bank branch in block 4, among others.

See also

Historic Centre of Trujillo
Chan Chan
Huanchaco
Puerto Chicama
Chimu
Pacasmayo beach
Plaza de Armas of Trujillo
Moche
Víctor Larco Herrera District
Vista Alegre
Buenos Aires
Las Delicias beach
Independence of Trujillo
Wall of Trujillo
Santiago de Huamán
Lake Conache
Marinera Festival
Trujillo Spring Festival
Wetlands of Huanchaco
Association of Breeders and Owners of Paso Horses in La Libertad
Salaverry beach
Puerto Morín
Virú culture
Marcahuamachuco
Wiracochapampa

External links
Location of "Paseo de Aguas" in Trujillo (Wikimapia)
"Huaca de la luna and Huaca del sol"
"Huacas del Sol y de la Luna Archaeological Complex", Official Website
Information on El Brujo Archaeological Complex
Chan Chan World Heritage Site, UNESCO
Chan Chan conservation project
Website about Trujillo, Reviews, Events, Business Directory
Municipality of Trujillo

Multimedia
 
 
 
 Gallery pictures of Trujillo by Panoramio, Includes Geographical information by various authors
Colonial Trujillo photos

References

Geography of Trujillo, Peru
Tourist attractions in Trujillo, Peru
Streets in Trujillo, Peru